Sarchenar (also Romanized as Sarchenār and Sar Chenār) is a village in, and the capital of, Zarrineh Rud-e Jonubi Rural District of the Central District of Miandoab County, West Azerbaijan province, Iran. At the 2006 National Census, its population was 1,824 in 439 households. The following census in 2011 counted 2,038 people in 577 households. The latest census in 2016 showed a population of 1,825 people in 596 households.

References 

Miandoab County

Populated places in West Azerbaijan Province

Populated places in Miandoab County